Melaleuca interioris is a plant in the myrtle family, Myrtaceae and is endemic to Western Australia, South Australia, Queensland, New South Wales and the Northern Territory. It was formerly included in Melaleuca uncinata and is similar to that species with its cylinder-shaped leaves and small heads of yellow flowers, but with smaller, less compressed fruiting capsules.

Description

The flowers are yellow and are arranged in heads which are composed of 4 to 9 groups of flowers in threes. There are five bundles of stamens around the flower, each with 4 to 9 stamens. The capsules remain separate from each other (whereas in Melaleuca uncinata they tend to become compressed together so that they look like a single fruit).

Taxonomy and naming
The specific epithet (interioris) refers to the interior of Australia, where this species is found.

Distribution and habitat
This melaleuca occurs in the central parts of Western Australia, the central parts of South Australia, the southern half of the Northern Territory, far west of New South Wales and the far south-west corner of Queensland. It grows in shrubland in red sand on the edges of salt lakes, and near ephemeral creeks, claypans and floodplains.

Conservation status
Melaleuca interioris is listed as "not threatened" by the Government of Western Australia Department of Parks and Wildlife.

Uses in agriculture
Melaleuca interioris and related species of melaleucas such as M. uncinata and M. atroviridis can be used to protect property from wind and water erosion, reduce salinity and waterlogging, provide wildlife habitat and provide income by harvesting for brushwood fencing.

References

interioris
Flora of Western Australia
Plants described in 2004
Taxa named by Lyndley Craven